Al-Raheiba is a Syrian city administratively linked to Al-Qutayfah in Damascus countryside province, located about  north of central Damascus.

References

Cities in Syria
Populated places in Rif Dimashq Governorate